The 1963–64 Loyola Ramblers men's basketball team represented Loyola University Chicago. The head coach was George Ireland. The Ramblers finished with a 22–6 record after finishing as the third place team for the Mideast region of the NCAA tournament.

Roster 

Sources: Sports Reference, Loyola yearbook

Rankings

References

External links

 Season statistics at Sports Reference

Loyola Ramblers men's basketball seasons
Loyola
Loyola
Loyola Ramblers
Loyola Ramblers